Frăsinet is a commune in Călărași County, Muntenia, Romania. It is composed of six villages: Curătești, Dănești, Frăsinet, Frăsinetu de Jos, Luptători and Tăriceni.

As of 2007 the population of Frăsinet is 1,799.

References

Communes in Călărași County
Localities in Muntenia